The Szegedin Highflyer is a breed of fancy pigeon developed over many years of selective breeding. Szegedin Highflyers, along with other varieties of domesticated pigeons, are all descendants from the rock pigeon (Columba livia).
The breed belongs to the Flying/Sporting pigeons group.

Origin
The breed was developed in Hungary (Szeged and other cities). Originally brought up from the Orient. Also known as a crested Tippler.

See also 

List of pigeon breeds

References

Pigeon breeds
Pigeon breeds originating in Hungary